Der Schuß durchs Fenster is a 1950 Austrian drama film directed, written by and starring Siegfried Breuer with Curd Jürgens.

Cast
Curd Jürgens as Dr. Winkler
Siegfried Breuer as Kriminalkommissar Rittner
Gunther Philipp as Kriminalassistent Jelinek
Fritz Eckhardt 
Hans Putz as Chauffeur Strinzel
Leopold Rudolf 
Eva Leiter as Grit Sorell
Edith Mill as Maria Vogt
Hans Dreßler 
Hans Therwal 
Franz Blauberger 
Otto Lange 
Franz Essel 
Bertl Halovanic 
Ilse Trenker 
Elvira Hofer

External links
 

1950 films
1950s German-language films
Austrian black-and-white films
1950 drama films
Austrian drama films